Tiana Opium Benjamin (born 5 October 1984) is an English actress, known for originally playing Chelsea Fox in the BBC soap opera EastEnders.

Career 
Benjamin trained at the Anna Scher Theatre in London. In 2005, she made a brief appearance in the film Harry Potter and The Goblet of Fire as Angelina Johnson, and voiced the character for the video game adaptation. In 2006, Benjamin joined the cast of BBC soap opera EastEnders, portraying the role of Chelsea Fox. Her decision to leave EastEnders was announced on 2 April 2010.

In 2011, Benjamin starred in the 2011 drama film Fast Girls. She also played a role in the fourth episode of BBC crime drama The Interceptor in 2015.

In 2016, Benjamin starred in The Dumping Ground as Bailey Wharton's mother Alison. It was later discovered that her character was the mother of Bryony.

Filmography

Film

Television

Video games

Awards and nominations

References

External links
 

1984 births
Living people
English people of Sierra Leonean descent
English film actresses
English television actresses
People from Enfield, London
Alumni of the Anna Scher Theatre School
Actresses from London
21st-century English actresses
English soap opera actresses